Bjørnevåg is a village and statistical area (grunnkrets) in Tjøme municipality, Norway.

The statistical area Bjørnevåg, which also can include the peripheral parts of the village as well as the surrounding countryside, has a population of 354.

The village Bjørnevåg is located between Tjøme village in the north and Verdens Ende in the south. It does not belong to an urban settlement.

Village in Sør-Trøndelag, Hitra.

References

Villages in Vestfold og Telemark